Eutin is the district capital of Eastern Holstein county located in the northern German state of Schleswig-Holstein. As of 2020, the town had some 17,000 inhabitants.

History
The name Eutin (originally Utin) is of Slavic origin. Its meaning is not quite clear; it is probably derived from the personal name "Uta". The Slavic Obotrites tribe settled eastern Holstein in the 7th/8th centuries A.D. and built a castle on Pheasant Island in the lake now called the Großer Eutiner See.

The originally Slavonic settlement of Utin was populated in the twelfth century by Dutch settlers. In 1156 Eutin became a market town. Town rights were granted in the year 1257. It later became the seat of the Prince-Bishopric of Lübeck, as Lübeck itself was an imperial free city. When the bishopric was secularized in 1803, Eutin became part of the Duchy of Oldenburg. As a result of the Greater Hamburg Act of 1937, Eutin passed from the Free State of Oldenburg to the Prussian Province of Schleswig-Holstein. After World War II, it became part of the modern Bundesland of Schleswig-Holstein.

Culture
Eutin is birthplace of composer Carl Maria von Weber. To honor him, an open-air theater was built in the park of Eutin Castle in 1951, and operas are performed there in July and August during the Eutin Opera Summer Festival. The seating capacity of this open-air venue is about 2000. The festival includes music students in Eutin as well as students from the University of Kansas in Lawrence, Kansas, US, which is the twin city of Eutin.

Eutin hosts an annual Blues Festival (Bluesfest Eutin) at the beginning of summer. Local musicians, as well as up and coming blues artists from around the world, come to play at this three-day outdoor blues festival, which takes place in the market place in the center of town. As the costs are covered by sponsoring, public funding and volunteer helpers, admission is free.

Geography and economy
Eutin is surrounded by a number of lakes of the Holsteinische Schweiz, including the Großer Eutiner See, Kleiner Eutiner See, Kellersee and Ukleisee. Many of the lakes are surrounded by forests. Popular activities on these lakes include boating, canoeing, rowing, swimming, and fishing.

Schleswig-Holstein, particularly Eutin, is known for its numerous rapeseed fields, which are used for biofuel production. Wind turbines are also a common sight in this rural region.

Historic buildings
Originally constructed as a fully functioning windmill in 1850 by Carl Friedrich Trahn, Die alte Mühle (the old mill) now serves as a bar and restaurant.

Sons and daughters of the city

 Tom Buk-Swienty (born 1966) historian, journalist and writer
 Wilhelm Dittmann (1874–1954), politician (USPD / SPD)
 Peter Engel (born 1940), writer
 Vadim Glowna (1941–2012), actor
 Hedvig Elisabeth Charlotte of Holstein-Gottorp (1759 – 1818), Queen of Sweden and Norway
 Ulf Kämpfer (born 1972), politician (SPD), Lord Mayor in Kiel
 Christian Klees (born 1968), Olympic winner 1996 in Atlanta
 Friedrich Kühn (1889–1944), officer, most recently General of the Panzertruppe
 Heinrich Limpricht (1827–1909), chemist
 Nicholas Mercator, (1620–1697), mathematician, born in Eutin or near Cismar
 Adolf Pansch (1841–1887), anatomist, anthropologist and polar explorer
 Axel Prahl (born 1960), film actor
 Daniel Richter (born 1962), artist
 Johann Friedrich Julius Schmidt (1825–1884), astronomer and geologist
 Ralph Schumacher (born 1964), philosopher and behavioral scientist
 Jonathan Stock (born 1983), journalist
 Peter Thoms (born 1940), actor and jazz musician
 Peter Friedrich Ludwig Tischbein (1813–1883), German chief forester, entomologist and paleontologist
 Friedrich Adolf Trendelenburg (1802–1872), philosopher.
 Friedrich August Ukert (1780–1851), historian, geographer, librarian
 Lars Unger (born 1972), former footballer
 Stefan Vogenauer (born 1968), legal scientist
 Carl Maria von Weber (1786–1826), composer.
 Dirk von Zitzewitz (born 1968), racing driver
 Wincent Weiss (born 1993), singer

Other people who worked in Eutin

 Matthias Claudius (1740–1815), poet
 Emanuel Geibel (1815–1884), lyricist
 Lotte Herrlich (1883–1956), (nude) photographer
 Friedrich Heinrich Jacobi (1743–1819), philosopher and writer
Johann Heinrich Voss (1751–1826), classicist and poet
 Johann Wilhelm Petersen (1649–1727), theologian
 Hans-Heinrich Sievert (1909–1963), athlete and Olympic athlete
 Johann Heinrich Wilhelm Tischbein (1751–1829), painter
 Ferdinand Tönnies (1855–1936), sociologist, lived from 1901 to 1921 in the Auguststraße 8 (now Albert-Mahlstedt-Straße)
 Wilhelm Wisser (1843–1935), high school professor and oral researcher

Twin towns – sister cities

Eutin is twinned with:
 Guldborgsund, Denmark
 Lawrence, United States
 Putbus, Germany

Each summer, Lawrence and Eutin take part in an exchange program, where high-school students from Lawrence and college students from the University of Kansas have some weeks in Eutin, while German students from Eutin come to Lawrence to study. The University of Kansas also has established an internship exchange program with Eutin.

Language
In addition to Standard German (Hochdeutsch), Low German (Plattdeutsch) is very commonly used in Eutin. A common greeting among the citizens is "moin", to which one replies with "moin moin".

See also 
 Utin (castle)
 Bridegroom's Oak

References

External links
Official website
Website of the Eutin Opera Summer Festival
View of Eutin from a live webcam on top of the Water Tower.

 
Towns in Schleswig-Holstein
Ostholstein
1250s establishments in the Holy Roman Empire
1257 establishments in Europe